Rusohoko is an administrative ward within Muhambwe Constituency in Kibondo District of Kigoma Region in Tanzania. In 2016 the Tanzania National Bureau of Statistics report there were 12,452 people in the ward.

References

Kibondo District
Wards of Kigoma Region
Constituencies of Tanzania